Stéphane Botteri (born 27 January 1962) is a French ice hockey player. He competed in the men's tournaments at the 1988 Winter Olympics, the 1992 Winter Olympics and the 1994 Winter Olympics.

References

1962 births
Living people
HC Morzine-Avoriaz players
Olympic ice hockey players of France
Ice hockey players at the 1988 Winter Olympics
Ice hockey players at the 1992 Winter Olympics
Ice hockey players at the 1994 Winter Olympics
Sportspeople from Annecy